Rossmoyne Senior High School is a public co-educational high day school in the City of Melville, located on Keith Road, Bull Creek, a southern riverside suburb of Perth, Western Australia.

Founded in 1968, the school provides education for approximately 2,100 students from Year 7 to Year 12.

History 
Construction of Rossmoyne Senior High School commenced in 1967 on land that was owned by the Webb family who originally came from Scotland. It opened for students the following year (1968).  The name Rossmoyne has no connection with the area but was thought to be suitable for marketing a subdivision in the area. Over the years the student catchment areas for Rossmoyne Senior High School were from Lynwood, Willetton, Riverton, Shelley, Bull Creek, Ferndale, southern end of Mount Pleasant, Booragoon and Brentwood. Now Rossmoyne Senior High School has restricted its mainstream intake to students from Rossmoyne, parts of Bull Creek and Willetton, Riverton, Shelley, Brentwood and Bateman, although it also runs a gifted and talented programme for academically gifted students. Students from years seven to ten (inclusive) are required to study a foreign language, with a choice of Chinese, German, French, and Japanese.

A fire at the school caused 500,000 worth of damage in 2008. The blaze destroyed a double demountable classroom with furniture and computer equipment, the arson squad were investigating the cause.

Campus 
The original section of the school is made up of several two storey buildings that together make a "H" shape. The administration block is on the northern side. Humanities & Social Sciences are on the western side. Home Economics, Woodwork, Metalwork and Arts are on the eastern side. Coming in from Keith Road, is an oval where students have Physical Education classes and the Performing Arts Centre, opened in 2004. At the southern side of the school there is a tennis court with basketball hoops, gymnasium, swimming pool and recently installed beach volleyball courts. Underneath the gymnasium is a dance studio which has female and male change-rooms. In the centre lies the library.

The School is also currently undergoing extensive reconstruction with plans to rebuild the school entirely in Four Stages. The Science Building was completed 2007 to provide more rooms for the core subject of sciences. This block, along with the Performing and Visual Arts Centre (PVAC for short), was part of Stage 1 of the Building Plan.

In 2012, Stage 2 of the Building Plan was completed, which involved a new English and Languages block, a tiered Amphitheatre, a new cafeteria known as "Pereira's Cafe" and an extension of the Performing Arts Centre. On the other side of the school an international-sized soccer field was laid out on the land that was formerly occupied by the ageing demountable buildings. A Health and Well-being Centre was built in 2013 which is considered an extension to the Gymnasium.

Other than these new buildings, Current Visual Arts Classrooms (Room 50 and 53) were converted to normal classrooms and there was landscaping to the new courtyards. A Selection Panel consisting of parents, community and school representatives has selected an artist who has been commissioned to design and install art works for the new building: including an extensive feature screen on the proposed colonnade connecting the new buildings.

As of 2013, construction of Stage 3 is underway, which involved building a block for Year 7s in preparation of their move from primary to high school in 2015. A new access road from the Apsley Road/Karel Avenue intersection, with student 'drop-off' zone, and bus zone was also added. 
Since 2017, the year 7 building has been relabelled as the mathematics building, seeing use from all year levels.

As of 2019, all classrooms were appropriately renamed to indicate their location, in an effort to facilitate navigation for students. Year 9s have been relocated to the west side of the school. In addition, the Year 8s and 10s have been relocated to a single quadrangle together. Room D33 has been demolished to make way for rooms OB1 and OB2.

Academic ranking, Western Australia
In 2001, the school was named The Australian newspaper's School Of The Year, ahead of one of the country's most exclusive private schoolsMethodist Ladies' College in Melbourne.

In the 2009 Western Australian Tertiary Entrance Examinations, Rossmoyne Senior High School had more students with a tertiary entrance rank of 99.95%, the highest possible rank, than any other school in the state.

The school has performed consistently well in the WACE school rankings and is often the best performing amongst all of the public schools in the state.

Beazley Medal

In 2017, Isabel Longbottom won the Beazley Medal for the top ranked WACE student.

Administration
Rossmoyne Senior High School's principal since 2021 is Alan Brown.

Notable alumni

Rhodes Scholars
1985: Grant Donaldson
1988: Ian Reid
1999: Craig Wood

Arts
Glyn Parry – writer of children's literature, young adult fiction and speculative fiction
Gary Twinn – musician (Supernaut, Twenty Flight Rockers, The International Swingers)
Amberley Lobo – TV presenter

Business and law
Grant Donaldson – Solicitor General of Western Australia
Corryn Rayney – registrar of Supreme Court of Western Australia who was found dead in Kings Park. Her death is still unsolved as of 2022.
Rob Scott – Wesfarmers Managing Director from 2017
Derek Lau – MasterChef Australia contestant 2019

Sport
Grant Boxall – wheelchair rugby player, Athens Paralympics 2004 & Beijing Paralympics 2008
Jason Diederich – swimmer, Seoul Paralympics 1988 & Barcelona Paralympics 1992
David Ferguson – Olympic indoor volleyballer, Athens 2004
Jo-Ann Galbraith – Olympic archery, Athens 2004
Heritier Lumumba – footballer, Collingwood & Melbourne
Jackie Pereira – Olympic hockey player, Seoul 1988, Barcelona 1992 & Atlanta 1996
Julien Prosser – Olympic beach volleyballer, Atlanta 1996, Sydney 2000 & Athens 2004
Jarrad Prue – Perth Wildcats basketball player
Rob Scott – silver medalist rower, Atlanta 1996
Vanessa Ward – Olympic athlete, Los Angeles 1984 & Seoul 1988

See also

 List of schools in the Perth metropolitan area

References

External links 
Rossmoyne Senior High School

Rock Eisteddfod Challenge participants
Public high schools in Perth, Western Australia
Educational institutions established in 1967
1967 establishments in Australia
Bull Creek, Western Australia